Barbara Jeanne Fields (born 1947 in Charleston, South Carolina) is a professor of American history at Columbia University.  Her focus is on the history of the American South, 19th century social history, and the transition to capitalism in the United States.

Life
Barbara Fields was raised in Washington, D.C., where she attended Morgan Elementary School, Banneker Junior High School, and Western High School.
She received her B.A. from Harvard University in 1968, and her Ph.D. from Yale University in 1978. At Yale, she was one of the last doctoral students of C. Vann Woodward, one of the preeminent American historians of the twentieth century.  She appears in Ken Burns' documentary series, The Civil War and The Congress.
 
Fields was the first African American woman to earn tenure at Columbia University.  She has also taught at Northwestern University, the University of Michigan, and the University of Mississippi. She is widely known for her 1990 essay, "Slavery, Race and Ideology in the United States of America." She authored the 2012 book Racecraft: The Soul of Inequality in American Life (along with her sister Karen Fields, a sociologist). The book argues that race is a product of racism; that racism is an ideology and a way of misunderstanding social reality; and that racecraft in American society serves to obfuscate the actual dynamics of inequality.

Bard College awarded Fields an honorary doctorate in May 2007. She received the Philolexian Award for Distinguished Literary Achievement in 2017.

Awards
 1992 MacArthur Fellows Program
 1986 John H. Dunning Prize of the American Historical Association, for Slavery and Freedom on the Middle Ground: Maryland during the Nineteenth Century
 Founders Prize of the Confederate Memorial Literary Society, for The Destruction of Slavery
 Thomas Jefferson Prize of the Society for the History of the Federal Government, for The Destruction of Slavery
 1994 Lincoln Prize by the Lincoln and Soldiers Institute at Gettysburg College, for Free At Last: A Documentary History of Slavery, Emancipation, and the Civil War

Works
"Slavery, Race and Ideology in the United States of America", New Left Review, Issue 181, May/June 1990
"Whiteness, Racism and Identity", International Labor & Working-Class History, Issue 60, Fall 2001
 "Origins of the New South and the Negro Question", Journal of Southern History, Vol 67 No 4, November 2001
"Of Rogues and Geldings", American Historical Review, Vol 180 No 5, December 2003
 Slavery and Freedom on the Middle Ground: Maryland during the Nineteenth Century (Yale University Press, 1985), 
 The Destruction of Slavery (Cambridge University Press, 1985), Editors Ira Berlin, Barbara J. Fields, Thavolia Glymph, Joseph P. Reidy, Leslie S. Rowland, 
 Slaves No More: Three Essays on the Emancipation and the Civil War (Cambridge University Press, 1992) 
 Free At Last: A Documentary History of Slavery, Emancipation, and the Civil War (The New Press, 1992) 
 Racecraft: The Soul of Inequality in American Life (Verso, 2012), with Karen Fields,

References

External Links 
"Presentation given by historian Barbara J. Fields at a "School", RACE, March 2001
2011 C-SPAN talk by Barbara Fields recorded in Charleston, South Carolina. 

Columbia University faculty
African-American historians
Harvard University alumni
Historians of the United States
Living people
Northwestern University faculty
University of Michigan faculty
University of Mississippi faculty
Lincoln Prize winners
Yale University alumni
MacArthur Fellows
Writers from Charleston, South Carolina
Writers from Washington, D.C.
American women historians
20th-century American historians
20th-century American women writers
1947 births